The following radio stations broadcast on FM frequency 107.5 MHz:

Argentina
 1075 in Mansilla, Entre Rios
 Activa in San Luis
 Alcira Gigena in Alcira Gigena, Córdoba
 Alternativa in Alvear, Corrientes
 Buena Vista in Sierras Chicas, Córdoba
 Cadena 3 Argentina in Tucumán
 Ciudad in Monte Cristo, Córdoba
 Condor in Mendoza
 Estacion X in La Falda, Córdoba
 Gen in Córdoba
 Milenium Patagonia in Dina Huapi, Río Negro
 Nuevos Horizontes in Villa de Mayo, Buenos Aires
 Reflejos in San Salvador, Entre Ríos
 San Martin in La Paz, Entre Ríos
 Super in Rosario, Santa Fe
 Río in Avellaneda, Buenos Aires
 Universidad in La Plata, Buenos Aires
 Xpress in Corrientes

Australia
 2OCB in Orange, New South Wales
 3MPH in Mildura, Victoria
 ABC Northern Tasmania in Strahan, Tasmania
 Triple J in Cairns, Queensland
 Triple J in Melbourne, Victoria

Canada (Channel 298)
 CBAF-FM-6 in Middleton, Nova Scotia
 CBAF-FM-11 in Mulgrave, Nova Scotia
 CBCK-FM in Kingston, Ontario
 CBRX-FM-1 in Matane, Quebec
 CFOO-FM in Burns Lake, British Columbia
 CFSM-FM in Cranbrook, British Columbia
 CFTX-FM-1 in Buckingham, Quebec
 CKKS-FM in Chilliwack, British Columbia
 CHBO-FM in Humboldt, Saskatchewan
 CIAM-FM-7 in Slave Lake, Alberta
 CIAM-FM-9 in Dawson Creek, British Columbia
 CIEG-FM in Egmont, British Columbia
 CISC-FM in Gibsons, British Columbia
 CITF-FM in Quebec City, Quebec
 CJDV-FM in Cambridge, Ontario
 CJIE-FM in Winnipeg Beach, Manitoba
 CJSE-FM-2 in Baie Ste. Anne, New Brunswick
 CKIZ-FM in Vernon, British Columbia
 CKMB-FM in Barrie, Ontario
 CKSJ-FM-1 in Clarenville, Newfoundland and Labrador
 VF2517 in New Denver, British Columbia

China 
 CNR The Voice of China in Jingdezhen and Siping
 CNR Business Radio in Nanjing

Indonesia
 PM3FHJ in Jakarta, Indonesia

Malaysia
 Bernama Radio in Johor Bahru, Johor and Singapore
 Fly FM in Kuala Terengganu, Terengganu
 Pahang FM in West Pahang and Klang Valley

Mexico
 XHIZU-FM in Izucar de Matamoros, Puebla
 XHKG-FM in Fortín, Veracruz
 XHNZ-FM in Ciudad Juárez, Chihuahua
 XHOM-FM in Coatzacoalcos, Veracruz
 XHPCO-FM in Paracho, Michoacán
 XHQRO-FM in Cortázar, Guanajuato
 XHSCAT-FM in Villa de Álvarez-Colima, Colima
 XHSCBC-FM in Témoris, Guazapares, Chihuahua
 XHSCCJ-FM in Tenancingo de Degollado, Estado de México
 XHSCCR-FM in Huejúcar, Jalisco
 XHSCDA-FM in San Pedro Mixtepec Distrito 22, Oaxaca
 XHSCDE-FM in Petatlán, Guerrero
 XHSTC-FM in Santiago Choapam, Oaxaca
 XHUSH-FM in Hermosillo, Sonora
 XHVOZ-FM in Guadalajara, Jalisco

New Zealand
Various low-power stations up to 1 watt

Philippines
 DWNU in Manila, Philippines as Wish FM
 DYNU in Cebu City
 DXNU in Davao City
 DWAQ in Legazpi City

United States (Channel 298)
 KABR (FM) in Alamo Community, New Mexico
 KASH-FM in Anchorage, Alaska
 KBGY in Faribault, Minnesota
 KBWG-LP in Browning, Montana
 KENR in Superior, Montana
 KFEB in Campbell, Missouri
 KGLK in Lake Jackson, Texas
 KHEI-FM in Kihei, Hawaii
 KHYT in Tucson, Arizona
 KIFS in Ashland, Oregon
 KILV in Castana, Iowa
 KJCN (FM) in Sutter Creek, California
 KJKJ in Grand Forks, North Dakota
 KJMH in Lake Arthur, Louisiana
 KJTJ-LP in Sidney, Nebraska
 KKDM in Des Moines, Iowa
 KKLV in Kaysville, Utah
 KKSJ-LP in Beloit, Kansas
 KKTZ in Mountain Home, Arkansas
 KLIZ-FM in Brainerd, Minnesota
 KLJE-LP in Columbia, Missouri
 KLVE in Los Angeles, California
 KMVK in Fort Worth, Texas
 KNOL in Jean Lafitte, Louisiana
 KNSG in Marshall, Minnesota
 KOND in Hanford, California
 KOSN in Ketchum, Oklahoma
 KOUG-LP in Pullman, Washington
 KPIG-FM in Freedom, California
 KQBA in Los Alamos, New Mexico
 KQBO in Rio Grande City, Texas
 KQKS in Lakewood, Colorado
 KRPM in Billings, Montana
 KSCB-FM in Liberal, Kansas
 KSED in Sedona, Arizona
 KSJT-FM in San Angelo, Texas
 KSMX-FM in Clovis, New Mexico
 KVBH in San Antonio, Texas
 KWBZ in Monroe City, Missouri
 KXJM in Banks, Oregon
 KXKZ in Ruston, Louisiana
 KXO-FM in El Centro, California
 KXTE in Pahrump, Nevada
 KYZK in Sun Valley, Idaho
 KZIG in Wapanucka, Oklahoma
 KZSZ in Colusa, California
 WABX in Evansville, Indiana
 WAMJ in Roswell, Georgia
 WAMR-FM in Miami, Florida
 WAZO in Southport, North Carolina
 WBBI in Endwell, New York
 WBFC-LP in Boynton, Georgia
 WBLS in New York, New York
 WBVE in Bedford, Pennsylvania
 WBYN-FM in Boyertown, Pennsylvania
 WCCN-FM in Neillsville, Wisconsin
 WCCW-FM in Traverse City, Michigan
 WCHV-FM in Charlottesville, Virginia
 WCKX in Columbus, Ohio
 WDBQ-FM in Galena, Illinois
 WDUZ-FM in Brillion, Wisconsin
 WEGW in Wheeling, West Virginia
 WFCC-FM in Chatham, Massachusetts
 WFNK in Lewiston, Maine
 WFXJ-FM in North Kingsville, Ohio
 WGCI-FM in Chicago, Illinois
 WGPR in Detroit, Michigan
 WHBQ-FM in Germantown, Tennessee
 WIOK in Falmouth, Kentucky
 WJHC (FM) in Jasper, Florida
 WKXI in Magee, Mississippi
 WKYB in Perryville, Kentucky
 WKZL in Winston-Salem, North Carolina
 WLDJ-LP in New Castle, Pennsylvania
 WLRG-LP in Corning, New York
 WMJW in Rosedale, Mississippi
 WNEE-LP in Tallahassee, Florida
 WNHA-LP in New Haven, Connecticut
 WNKT in Eastover, South Carolina
 WNNT-FM in Warsaw, Virginia
 WPZM-LP in Gainesville, Florida
 WQTP-LP in Columbus, Mississippi
 WRUU-LP in Savannah, Georgia
 WRVW in Lebanon, Tennessee
 WRWR in Cochran, Georgia
 WTIF-FM in Omega, Georgia
 WWGF in Donalsonville, Georgia
 WWMM-LP in Collinsville, Connecticut
 WYDD-LP in Youngstown, Florida
 WYLJ in Terre Haute, Indiana
 WZLK in Virgie, Kentucky
 WZRX-FM in Fort Shawnee, Ohio
 WZZZ in Portsmouth, Ohio

Vietnam
Da Lat + VOV1 and LamDongFM in Da Lat City, Lam Dong Province

References

Lists of radio stations by frequency